Anzola may refer to:
 Anzola dell'Emilia, municipality in the Metropolitan City of Bologna in the Italian region Emilia-Romagna
 Anzola d'Ossola, municipality in the Province of Verbano-Cusio-Ossola in the Italian region Piedmont
 Anzola (surname), surname